Ohayo Mountain is a mountain located in the Catskill Mountains of New York southeast of Wittenberg. Acorn Hill is located northwest, Ashokan Ridge is located south, and Mount Guardian is located north of Ohayo Mountain.

References

Mountains of Ulster County, New York
Mountains of New York (state)